Lycée Louis-Barthou is a secondary school in Pau, Pyrénées-Atlantiques, France.

History
The school's history goes back to a religious establishment founded by Jesuits in 1640. It is named for French politician Louis Barthou.

Academics
The school offers classes at the Seconde, Première (scientifique, littéraire, économique et social) SMTG, and Terminale level as well as Classes Préparatoires aux Grandes Ecoles.

Notable pupils

Academia
 Pierre Bourdieu (1930, in Denguin -2002) - sociologist
 Guy Debord (1931 – 1994) - Marxist theorist, philosopher, filmmaker, critic of work
 Louis Favoreu (1936 – 2004) - academic, specialized in public law, and a jurist
 Philippe Leveau (born 1940 in Angoulême) - historian and archaeologist

Arts
 Comte de Lautréamont (1846-1870) - poet
 Titouan Lamazou (born 1955 in Casablanca) -  navigator, artist and writer
 Saint-John Perse (1887-1975) - poet-diplomat, awarded the Nobel Prize in Literature in 1960 "for the soaring flight and evocative imagery of his poetry."
 Joseph Peyré (1892-1968) - writer
 Frederick Cayley Robinson (1862 – 1927) - English artist

Media and entertainment
 Daniel Balavoine (1952-1986) - singer-songwriter
 Nathalie Cardone (born 1967) - actress and singer
 Isabelle Ithurburu (born 1983) - sports journalist and television presenter
 Denis Lalanne (1926 – 2019) - sports journalist

Politics
 Louis Barthou (1862-1934) - politician; Prime Minister of France
 Henri Emmanuelli (1945-2017) - politician SP
 Éric Piolle (born 1973) - engineer and politician (EELV)
 Boris Vallaud (born 1975) - politician (SP)

Sports
 Édouard Cissé (born 1978) - soccer player
 Tony Estanguet (born 1978) - canoeist, Olympic champion
 Franck Lestage (born 1968) - athlete  
 Robert Paparemborde (1948-2001) - rugby player

Other
 Léopold Eyharts (born 1957) - astronaut

See also
 List of Jesuit sites

External links

References

Education in France
Pau, Pyrénées-Atlantiques
Secondary schools in France
Boarding schools in France
1640 establishments in France